Cardona is a town in the Spanish region of Catalonia, in the province of Barcelona; about  northwest of the city of Barcelona, on a hill almost surrounded by the river Cardener, a branch of the Llobregat. To the east of the town, the river has been diverted through a tunnel has been dug through a spur, leaving a loop of dry river bed near the saltmine.

Near the town is an extensive deposit of rock salt. The salt forms a mountain mass (called Muntanya de Sal) covered by a thick bed of a reddish-brown clay, and apparently resting on a yellowish-grey sandstone.  It is generally more or less translucent, and large masses of it are quite transparent. The hill has been worked like a mine since Roman times; pieces cut from it have been carved by artists in Cardona into images, crucifixes and many articles of an ornamental kind.

Main sights
The Castle of Cardona, which is set high on a hill and contains a Parador hotel.
The 11th-century Romanesque Church of St. Vincenç.
The Church of Sant Miquel, built in the 11th century and rebuilt in the 14th century in Gothic style. It houses a precious polyptych by Pere Vall, depicting St. Anne, the Virgin and St. Amador, and a 15th-century baptismal font.

Local festivals 
Caramelles: The Sunday of Passover
Mercat de la ganga: The first Sunday of February
Fira de Pentecostés: The first Sunday of June
Fira de la Llenega: The last Sunday of October
Festa Major: The second last weekend in September
Aplec de Cardona: 18  September

Notable people 
 
 
 Serafín Marsal (1862–1956), Paraguayan sculptor
 Berto Romero, comedian.

Notes 
The movie Chimes at Midnight, by Orson Welles, was filmed at the castle in Cardona.

Twin towns 
  Cardona, Uruguay

Bibliography 

Pedrosa, Andreu (2001). The Castle of Cardona. Sant Vincenç de Castellet: Farell. 
 Panareda Clopés, Josep Maria; Rios Calvet, Jaume; Rabella Vives, Josep Maria (1989). Guia de Catalunya, Barcelona: Caixa de Catalunya.  (Spanish).  (Catalan).

References

External links 

  (in Catalan)
 Associació Cultural El Mercat del Blat (Cultural Association of Cardona)
 Associació Cultural 18 de Setembre (Cultural Association of Cardona)
 Government data pages 

Municipalities in Bages
Populated places in Bages